Shirley Hilda Stanley Smith (10 October 1916 – 29 December 2007) was a lawyer from New Zealand.

Background 
Smith was born in 1916 in Wellington, New Zealand, and was the daughter of barrister and judge Sir David Smith. She attended Queen Margaret College and Nga Tawa Diocesan School.

On 2 June 1944, Smith married William Ball Sutch. Together they had one daughter.

Career 

Smith's interest in the law began through conversations with her father, David Smith, although he did not initially approve of her pursuing a legal career. Instead, she studied Classics at the University of Oxford and then returned to New Zealand to teach. After attending a lecture in New York on the Commission on the Status of Women, she was inspired to train as a lawyer. After returning to New Zealand in 1951, she enrolled in Victoria University of Wellington's Faculty of Law.

While undertaking her legal training, Smith was one of around five women in the law school and she challenged the policies of the New Zealand Law Society and Wellington District Law Society that disallowed women from attending their dinners.

After graduating in 1957, Smith became the 41st woman to be admitted as a barrister and solicitor of the High Court of New Zealand. She first worked as a law clerk at Wellington firm before deciding to enter academia.

In 1957, Smith joined the Victoria University of Wellington and became the first woman in New Zealand to lecture in law and be a full member of a law faculty. She lectured for two years and taught constitutional Law and Roman law. During this time she was the only female faculty member. She was also the first editor of the Victoria University of Wellington Law Review.

Smith left the university to practice general law as a sole practitioner. Between 1961–1994 she worked in Wellington as a barrister and solicitor. Although her cases were varied she became known for her work in family law and criminal law. She was drawn to cases of relating to social justice and did pro bono work for a number of organisations, including the Cook Island Society of New Zealand (Wellington) and the Society for Research on Women. She also represented a number of gang members in criminal cases, including members of the Porirua chapter of the Mongrel Mob and Wellington chapter of the Black Power Gang.

In the early 1990s, Smith stopped practising law. In 1995 she was made an honorary life member of the Wellington District Law Society.

Shirley Smith Address 
In honour of Shirley Smith, the Women in Law Committee of the New Zealand Law Society's Wellington branch began the annual Shirley Smith Address. The event began in 2008 and occurs annually. Previous speakers have included:

References

Further reading 
 Works by Smith in the New Zealand Electronic Text Collection
 My Life in the Law, Shirley Smith

External links 
 The Shirley Smith Address

1916 births
2007 deaths
New Zealand women lawyers
20th-century New Zealand lawyers
Alumni of the University of Oxford
Victoria University of Wellington alumni
Academic staff of the Victoria University of Wellington
People from Wellington City
People educated at Queen Margaret College, Wellington
People educated at Nga Tawa Diocesan School
20th-century women lawyers